Peruzzi, family of bankers of Florence
 Peruzzi (singer), Nigerian singer and songwriter
 Peruzzi v. Italy, a decision made by the European Court of Human Rights 
 Angelo Peruzzi,  Italian football goalkeeper
 Baldassare Peruzzi, a leading Italian architect of the earlier 16th century
 Gino Peruzzi, an Argentine footballer
 Giovanni Sallustio Peruzzi, an Italian architect
 Mario Peruzzi, an Italian-born American businessman and manufacturer
 Meredith Peruzzi, American museum director
 Ubaldino Peruzzi, an Italian politician of the Kingdom of Sardinia and the Kingdom of Italy